The 1993 Finisterre Range earthquakes began on October 13 with a  6.9 mainshock, followed by  6.5 and 6.7 earthquakes. These earthquakes struck beneath the Finisterre Range, north of Markham Valley in Morobe Province, Papua New Guinea. The complex earthquake sequence seriously damaged many villages in the rural Eastern Papua New Guinea region, generating landslides and killing at least 60 people.

Tectonic setting
Papua New Guinea is situated in a region where the Pacific, Australian, Caroline and several microplates are converging. At the Huon Peninsula, the Woodlark Plate is moving north, converging beneath the South Bismarck Plate along the Markham Valley. The tectonic motion forms a complex zone of subduction and continental collision zones which affect the region. Due to the location at a major plate boundary zone, Papua New Guinea is struck by earthquakes and tsunamis frequently and is one of the world's most seismically active regions.

The Finisterre Range, where the earthquakes occurred, is predominantly volcanic in origin, consisting of volcaniclastics and volcanic strata. Bedrock landsliding is frequent within the range, caused by rainfall and earthquakes associated with nearby thrust faults. Historical earthquakes near the mountains date back to 1876 when locals described feeling strong shaking at the coast and on the mountains. Europeans in Papua New Guinea also detailed the absence of vegetation on the range, finding only bare rock. Another earthquake in 1922 caused major damage.

Earthquake
The earthquake with a hypocenter beneath the Finisterre Range occurred in close proximity to the Ramu Markham Fault. This fault runs along the southern flanks of the Finisterre Range in the Markham Valley, where the range is the hanging wall. Characterized as a thrust fault, it has a northeast-dipping angle of 40° beneath the range. The fault is also a suture zone where the Finisterre island arc Terrane; a fragment of crust, joins the larger tectonic plates in the region. A slip rate of /yr was measured using electronic instruments.

The 6.9 and 6.7 mainshocks are the largest to occur near the fault and are considered a doublet earthquake due to their close magnitude, location and timing. GPS measurements at the surface reflected significant vertical displacement, indicating the rupture propagated to or near the surface. It was initially suspected that the Ramu Markham Fault was the sole seismogenic source of the earthquakes, but the fault is a shallow crustal type which geometry was not consistent with that of the earthquakes. Rather, the earthquakes were associated with shallow-angle thrust faulting at a depth too deep for the Ramu Markham Fault. A décollement which lies beneath the Ramu Markham Fault is consistent with the rupture geometry. Large surface displacements provided evidence that the décollement and Ramu Markham Fault ruptured at the same time. It also indicated the rupture ceased several hundred meters beneath the ground surface.

Impact
Two airstrips were seriously damaged, forcing a closure. At least 58 villages were so badly affected that an evacuation of its 8,000 residents was carried out. Many homes and schools constructed of wood in the mountains survived the earthquake with slight to moderate damage due to their flexibility. Food-producing gardens were destroyed by the ground effects which threatened the food supply of the residents. A total of 1,224 homes were demolished by the quake, and 24 schools had to close. An initial report stated that the quake killed four people and left more than 40 missing, but the death toll climbed to over 60, and later, 65 when officials conducted their search and rescue operations.

Landslides blocked many rivers flowing southwards from the range, forming quake lakes, many of which were breached. A breached lake sent debris rolling down the mountains and destroyed two bridges on the Lae-Madang highway. Further landslides were triggered when dozens of small aftershocks shook the already unstable ground left by the mainshocks. One landslide began along a steep hillside near the Leron River, burying 19 people. The Leron River was dammed by slides that quickly formed quake lakes and were breached. Some of the largest debris avalanches caused windblasts that blew down and stripped the leaves off trees. In the months ahead of the quake, numerous quake lakes were breached by rainfall but caused limited damage and no casualties. A total of 680 landslides were identified via satellite imagery by January 1994. A more recent analysis in 2008 identified over 4,700 landslides in the mountains. An earthquake on April 25, 1995, breached a lake, destroying a bridge rebuilt after the 1993 quake.

The Yonki Dam and hydropower station on the Ramu river ceased operations, as part of its fail-safe procedure. Operations resumed after inspections by the Papua New Guinea Electricity Commission found no serious damage. The quake was felt in Lae, Madang, and Goroka, where no serious damage was reported. Slight damage such as cracked concrete roofing sheets and water tanks occurred in Ramu Sugar.

The Papua New Guinea government created an educational program for the evacuated inhabitants on the risks of landslides. The inhabitants returned to their rebuilt or relocated villages a month later.

See also 
List of earthquakes in 1993
List of earthquakes in Papua New Guinea

References

External links

1993 earthquakes
1993 floods in Oceania
Earthquakes in Papua New Guinea
1993 in Oceania
Morobe Province
Huon Peninsula montane rain forests
Landslides in 1993
Doublet earthquakes
Earthquake clusters, swarms, and sequences
Landslide-dammed lakes
1993 disasters in Papua New Guinea 
1993 in Papua New Guinea